Sortol is a rural locality (a selo) in Bappagayinsky Rural Okrug of Vilyuysky District in the Sakha Republic, Russia, located  from Vilyuysk, the administrative center of the district, and  from Ilbenge, the administrative center of the rural okrug. Its population as of the 2010 Census was 0, the same as recorded during the 2002 Census.

References

Notes

Sources
Official website of the Sakha Republic. Registry of the Administrative-Territorial Divisions of the Sakha Republic. Vilyuysky District. 

Rural localities in Vilyuysky District